In 2016, a report from the Department of Housing and Urban Development (HUD) revealed that the U.S. state of Oregon had an estimated homeless population of 13,238 with about 60.5% of these people still unsheltered. In 2017, these numbers were even higher. As of January 2017, Oregon has an estimated 13,953 individuals experiencing homelessness. Of this homeless population, 1,083 are family households, 1,251 are veterans, 1,462 are unaccompanied young adults (aged 18–24), and 3,387 are individuals experiencing chronic homelessness. As of 2022, 17,959 people total experienced homelessness in Oregon, with 2,157 individuals being youth under 18, 6,671 being female, 10,931 being male, and 131 being transgender. Also among the 17,959 total homeless in 2022, 15,876 were Non-Hispanic/Non-Latino, 2,083 were Hispanic/Latino, 13,960 were white, 1,172 were Black, African American, or African, 101 were Asian or Asian American, 880 were Native American, and those of multiple race were 1,619. Oregon has seen an increase in its total homeless population consistently every year since 2010. In last three years specifically Oregon has seen a 98.5% increase 2021-2022, 22.5% increase 2020-2021, and a 13.1% increase 2019-2020. 

Homeless people have found themselves unwelcome near businesses in Portland. Some of the complaints given are that homeless people 'scare customers away'; 'are too noisy'; and that 'they block the way'. A city ordinance called 'sidewalk obstruction ordinance'  was an ordinance which homeless advocates complained "criminalizes homelessness". This was however, quashed by a judge's decision in 2009. This decision left the police and business owners with disorderly conduct which the police chief said comes with the difficulty of proving intent and finding witnesses.

Portland

In Portland, the local government took efforts in trying to become a zero-homeless city, which failed to meet its mission. This is through a 10-year plan which they proposed in 2005 which states that they would move people into affordable housing rather than moving them to temporary shelters.

Illegal camps have been growing in and around Portland since the beginning of COVID-19 pandemic. Some of those have become a public safety and health concerns. One of the leading complaints about transient camps in Portland has been the used hypodermic needles on the ground which has been worsening as city suspended cleanups during the pandemic. Businesses in Old Town Chinatown have voiced concerns about the increasing number of tents A business owner and Old Town Chinatown neighborhood board member interviewed by The Oregonian said the number of tents have grown significantly since the pandemic and have heard from his customers that they don't feel comfortable visiting the area.

Handling of illegal-camp cleanups 

Multiple news outlet reported on the city auditor's report on the city's handling of illegal campsite clean ups by the Homelessness/Urban Camping Impact Reduction Program. Since 2015, the City of Portland implemented a streamlined campsite complaint intake. City contractors then removed tents, items and other items and stored them. The database was to prioritize cleanup based on "biohazards, garbage and other factors, such as whether campers are aggressive or openly using drugs". The Oregonian summarized that the auditors found little evidence prioritization was occurring and no clear indication of what criteria were invoked in selecting which camps are to be removed or not removed and auditors documented the city often ignored hundreds of complaints made by residents. The newspaper commented "That non-response doesn’t comport with the crackdown on illegal camping instituted by Mayor Ted Wheeler earlier in his term." The audit conducted in summer and fall of 2018 reported that the city needed to improve communications to illegal campers as well as complainants. The auditor recommends providing complainants with a status update. In 2019, the city announced they intend to do that with a new app that helps people "better record and understand HUCIRP" As of June 2020, the status update for reporting party has yet to be implemented per city's own status update.

In October of 2022, a Portland mayor addressed the homeless crisis in Portland again, noting how it is "nothing short of a humanitarian catastrophe". He addressed how the homeless population should be moved to the resources that would benefit them the most. The most current resolution plan for the homeless crisis in Portland is to establish three large designated camping sites. Mayor Ted Wheeler is hoping to begin this resolution no later than 18 months after the funding is confirmed. 

These designated camping areas would be able to serve approximately 125 people and would "provide access to services such as food, hygiene, litter collection and treatment for mental health and substance abuse".

Safe Rest Villages

Deschutes County
Deschutes County, Oregon is currently experiencing a large population growth. As of 2022, there are roughly 1,286 homeless people in Deschutes county. This is a 17% increase from 2021. The Emergency Houselessness Task Force has developed a crisis plan in hope to decrease these numbers.  

Between 2013 and February 2019, the police department has seen a 60% increase in "unwanted person" complaints. Homeless represent 3% of population while representing 52% of arrests.

References

External links

 City of Portland official transient encampment complaints map